Carreg yr Halen is a very small tidal island in the Menai Strait. Its centre  lies approximately 20 metres offshore from the Belgian Promenade in Menai Bridge just upstream of the Menai Suspension Bridge. Only the rocky tip of the island is visible at high spring tide but at low tide  area of rock, sand and some seaweed are exposed which provides feeding ground for a variety of wading birds including oystercatcher, redshank, and curlew.

References

Islands of Anglesey
Menai Bridge